Hope Temple, born as Alice Maude (called "Dotie") Davis (27 December 1859 – 10 May 1938) was an Irish songwriter and composer. She was also known as Mrs André Messager.

Life
Alice Davis was born in Dublin, Ireland, and was known professionally as Hope Temple. She moved with her family to England aged 12 and began composing ballads at the age of 14. Initially she studied music with the idea of becoming a pianist, but an injury in a riding accident caused her to give up her ambitions. Her teachers in London included John Francis Barnett (piano) and Edouard Silas (harmony and counterpoint). In the early 1890s she continued her studies in Paris with André Wormser and André Messager. In 1892, her operetta The Wooden Spoon was produced in London (also in New York, 1893), but she was known primarily for her songs, some of which became very popular. Her song My Lady's Bower is sung by Molly Bloom in James Joyce's Ulysses.

In 1892, a reproduction of a photograph of her taken by Alex Bassano of Old Bond Street, London, was published in the Strand Magazine, as part of a series called "Types of English Beauty".

In 1894, she assisted Messager in writing the opera Mirette, and then became his second wife in 1895.

Hope Temple died in Folkestone, England.

Selected works
Stage
The Wooden Spoon (1892)
Mirette, opéra comique (1894), with Andre Messager, Fred E. Weatherly, Harry Greenbank and Adrian Ross

Songs
In Sweet September (Fred E. Weatherly), 1880
Tis all that I can say (Thomas Hood), 1880
She Walks in Beauty (Lord Byron), 1881
An Old Garden (Helen Marion Burnside), c.1886
My Lady's Bower (Fred E. Weatherly), 1887
A Golden Argosy (Fred E. Weatherly), 1889
Love and Friendship (John Muir), 1889
Mary Grey (Clifton Bingham), 1890
Rory Darlin (Fred E. Weatherly), 1892
Adieu l'amour / Love's Adieu (Catulle Blée), 1893
Auf Wiederseh'n (Henry Wadsworth Longfellow), 1893
Colin Deep (William Akerman), 1895
The Garden of Dreams (Clifton Bingham), 1900
Au bord des flots (Louis Fortolis), 1905Piano music'''A Summer Dream (1895)A Night in Seville'' (c.1921)

References

1859 births
1938 deaths
19th-century classical composers
19th-century women composers
20th-century classical composers
20th-century women composers
Irish classical composers
Irish women classical composers
Irish songwriters